The Tunisia national youth handball team is the Tunisia national under-18 handball team, nicknamed Les Aigles de Carthage (The Eagles of Carthage or The Carthage Eagles), that represent Tunisia in the international handball competitions and it is Controlled by the Tunisian Handball Federation

Competitive record
 Champions   Runners-up   Third Place   Fourth Place  

Red border color indicates tournament was held on home soil.

Youth Olympic Games

World Youth Championship

African Youth Championship

Arab Youth Championship

Maghrebian Youth Championship

See also
Tunisia men's national handball team
Tunisia men's national junior handball team
Tunisia women's national youth handball team

Other handball codes
 Tunisia national beach handball team

References

External links
Official website 
IHF profile

Handball in Tunisia
Men's national youth handball teams
National sports teams of Tunisia